The Orsha offensives were a series of battles fought in Belarus between the Red Army and the Wehrmacht during the autumn of 1943, and into the following winter. Orsha was a main road junction with the north-south route from Leningrad to Kiev and the east-west route from Minsk to Moscow. After the failure of Operation Typhoon in the winter of 1941, Army Group Centre had spent the most part on the defensive in the central sector of the front. The time afforded to them in 1942, a distinct period of inactivity in this area, allowed the Wehrmacht to build formidable defensive positions.

Prelude

After their defeat in the Battle of Smolensk, the Wehrmacht retreated on a broad front to the Panther-Stellung line. The German 4th Army (Heinrici)—part of Army Group Centre—took defensive positions near Orsha. To the north, the 3rd Panzer Army (Reinhardt) took up defensive lines around Vitebsk, and to the south the 9th Army (Model) held the area east of Bobrujsk. The Soviet Stavka saw the liberation of Ukraine as their primary goal, so the Lower Dnieper Offensive had priority in equipment and reinforcements.

The battles
The 4th Army was in retreat to the Panther-Wotan line, pursued by the Soviets. Troops from the Soviet Western Front then launched a heavy attack on both sides of the Minsk-Moscow highway. One thrust was directed at Orsha, a main road junction, and another at Bogushevsk.

Notes

References

Literature
Frieser K-H., Schmider K. & Schönherr K. (2007) Das deutsche Reich und der Zweite Weltkrieg, Vol. 8, Die Ostfront 1943/44, Deutsche Verlags-Anstalt, Stuttgart: 1350 pp.

Battles and operations of the Soviet–German War
Battles of World War II involving Germany
Battles involving the Soviet Union
October 1943 events
November 1943 events
1943 in the Soviet Union